Boom Boom or Boom-Boom is a nickname for:

 Shahid Afridi (born 1980), Pakistani cricketer
 Rey Bautista (born 1986), Filipino boxer
 Scott Beaumont (born 1978), English mountain bike racer
 Boom-Boom Beck (1904–1987), American Major League Baseball pitcher
 Boris Becker (born 1967), German tennis player
 Kevin Bieksa (born 1981), Canadian National Hockey League player
 Randy Blake (born 1986), American kickboxer
 Colt Cabana (born 1980), American professional wrestler
 Freddy Cannon (born 1940), American rock and roller
 Fred Couples (born 1959), American golfer
 Bernie Geoffrion (1931–2006), Canadian National Hockey League player
 Tom Johnson (American boxer) (born 1964), American boxer and IBF featherweight champion (1993-1997)
 Sabine Lisicki (born 1989), German tennis player
 Ray Mancini (born 1961), American boxer
 John McCombe (born 1985), English footballer
 Alan Minter (born 1951), English boxer

See also 

 
 
 Boom (nickname)
 Boomer (nickname)

Lists of people by nickname